SHL M11 was Polish motorcycle 175 cc class, manufactured in 1961-1968 in SHL in Kielce.

History 
SHL M11 was a development of M06T 150 cc motorcycle. Main change was bigger 173 cc engine S-32. The design was revised and improved. Visible difference was adding metal side panels, covering carburettor, battery and air filter.

The 173 cc S-32 engine was developed in Poland, basing upon S-06 150 cc engine, which in turn was developed from German DKW RT 125. A capacity was increased by increasing bore, and other changes were applied. The engine was produced by Warszawska Fabryka Motocykli (WFM) in Warsaw. Later an improved variant S-32U was introduced, with power increased by 1 hp. From 1967 there was a new model M11W produced, with new Polish-designed engine W-2A Wiatr, 174 cc capacity. Its power was increased by 2 hp, to 12 hp. W-2A engines were produced by Metal Works Dezamet in Nowa Dęba. In spite of its rather limited capacity, it was the second Polish motorcycle at that time, as regards to the capacity and power, after the SFM Junak, and the first Polish motorcycle 175 cc class.

Prototypes of the M11 were constructed in 1959. A production started in May 1961. From 1965 smaller 18 in wheels replaced 19 in wheels. From  1967 until July 1968, M11W model was produced, with W-2A Wiatr engine. Also a small series of rally variant M11R, with a telescopic fork was made. Nearly 180,000 were made, including 26,000 M11W.

Most motorcycles were sold in Poland, but they were also exported, among others to the USA. In 1962 a licence were sold to Escorts Group in India, where they were produced until 2005 as Rajdoot Excel-T.

References 
 Adam Zakrzewski, Auto-moto PRL: władcy dróg i poboczy, Demart, Warszawa 2010, p. 128-131 

Motorcycles introduced in 1961
SHL motorcycles